East End School District (EESD)  is a public school district based in Bigelow, Arkansas, United States. The school district supports more than 650 students in prekindergarten through grade 12 in the 2010–11 school year by employing more than 95 faculty and staff on a full time equivalent basis for its two schools.

The school district encompasses  of land, in Perry County and serves Bigelow, Houston, Fourche, Little Italy, and Wye Mountain. The district extends into a section of Pulaski County.

Schools 
 Bigelow High School, based in Bigelow and serving grades 7 through 12.
 Anne Watson Ełementary School, based in Bigelow and serving prekindergarten through grade 6.

Interscholastic activities at the junior varsity and varsity level are played at the 2A Classification level administered by the Arkansas Activities Association. The mascot for the junior/senior high school is the Panther..

References

External links

 

Education in Perry County, Arkansas
Education in Pulaski County, Arkansas
School districts in Arkansas
1912 establishments in Arkansas
School districts established in 1912